Paul Tyrrell Faries  (born February 20, 1965) is an American former professional baseball second baseman, who played during four seasons in Major League Baseball (MLB) with the San Diego Padres and San Francisco Giants. He was drafted by the Padres in the 23rd round of the 1987 Major League Baseball draft.

Early life
Faries attended Campolindo High School in Moraga, California and 
attended Pepperdine University in 1984-87.

Faries became one of the earliest Waves to earn All-American status, as the American Baseball Coaches Association put him on its third team in 1987. He shared West Coast Conference Player of the Year honors with teammate Steve Erickson (who had also been his teammate at Campolindo High) during his senior season as well. He was named to the All-WCC first team as a sophomore and a senior, and to the second team as a junior.

References

External links

  
"Paul Faries". Society for American Baseball Research. Retrieved on 14 March 2009.

1965 births
Living people
American expatriate baseball players in Canada
Baseball players from Berkeley, California
Buffalo Bisons (minor league) players
Edmonton Trappers players
High Desert Mavericks players
Iowa Cubs players
Las Vegas Stars (baseball) players
Major League Baseball second basemen
New Orleans Zephyrs players
People from Moraga, California
Pepperdine Waves baseball players
Phoenix Firebirds players
Riverside Red Wave players
San Diego Padres players
San Francisco Giants players
Spokane Indians players
Toledo Mud Hens players
Wichita Wranglers players
Alaska Goldpanners of Fairbanks players